The Ketchikan Daily News is the primary daily newspaper for Ketchikan, Alaska, founded in 1934.

Lew Williams, Jr., who became the paper's managing editor in 1966, was well known in Alaska as an opinion columnist. Originally appearing mainly in the Anchorage Times, his columns were regularly published in many Alaskan newspapers up until his death.  His children (including Lew Williams III, the mayor of Ketchikan 1990 - 2018)

Content
The Ketchikan Daily News is usually made up of one section including Local, Alaska, Opinion, Sports, Entertainment, Nation, and World pages in its Monday, Tuesday, Thursday and Friday editions. The Wednesday edition includes a "B" section usually titled "Education." The Weekend Edition covering Saturday and Sunday has a B section titled "Waterfront" along with Sunday Comics and a "Local Scene" supplement that contains book and movie reviews and occasionally an article on coming performances or art events.

External links
 

1934 establishments in Alaska
Daily newspapers published in the United States
Ketchikan, Alaska
Newspapers published in Alaska
Publications established in 1934